Medauromorpha  is an Asian genus of stick insects in the family Phasmatidae, subfamily Clitumninae and tribe Medaurini.  Species have a known distribution from Vietnam and southern China.

Species 
Medauromorpha includes the following species:
 Medauromorpha baviensis Bresseel & Constant, 2017
 Medauromorpha foedata (Brunner von Wattenwyl, 1907)
 Medauromorpha regina (Brunner von Wattenwyl, 1907) - type species (as Cuniculina regina Brunner von Wattenwyl)

References

External links

Phasmatodea genera
Phasmatodea of Indo-China